Rembercourt-Sommaisne is a commune in the Meuse department in Grand Est in northeastern France.

Rembercourt-Sommaisne was created on 1 January 1973 when the former communes of Rembercourt-aux-Pots and Sommaisne were joined together.

Geography
The Chée forms part of the commune's southern border.

The Aisne rises near Sommaisne, a hamlet in the northern part of the commune.

See also
Communes of the Meuse department

References

Rembercourtsommaisne